Kurdish rugs are rugs woven by Kurds in Kurdistan. When referring to Kurdish rugs within the rug industry, one is referring to those made within Iranian Kurdistan.

Gallery

See also
Bidjar rug
Yürük rug
Persian rug

References

External links

Encyclopædia Britannica

Kurdish culture
Rugs and carpets
Oriental rugs and carpets